"Blowups Happen" is a 1940 science fiction short story by American writer Robert A. Heinlein. It is one of two stories in which Heinlein, using only public knowledge of nuclear fission, anticipated the actual development of nuclear technology a few years later. The other story is "Solution Unsatisfactory", which is concerned with a nuclear weapon, although it is only a radiological "dirty bomb", not a nuclear explosive device.

The story was first published in Astounding Science Fiction in 1940, before any nuclear reactors had ever been built, and for its appearance in the 1946 anthology The Best of Science Fiction, Heinlein made some modifications to reflect how a reactor actually worked. In the omnibus The Past Through Tomorrow, "Blowups Happen" is referred to as a 1940 story, but it mentions Hiroshima and Nagasaki, reflecting revisions made in 1946.

The story made a later appearance in The Worlds of Robert A. Heinlein, a collection of short stories published in 1966. It also appears in his Expanded Universe in 1980, but here it appears as it did in Astounding in 1940 and Heinlein writes in an introduction to the story: "I now see, as a result of the enormous increase in the art in 33 years, more errors in the '46 version than I spotted in the '40 version when I checked it in '46".

The story is one of the earliest in Heinlein's Future History chronology, taking place in the late 20th century.

Plot
The story describes the tensions among the staff of a nuclear reactor. Heinlein's concept of a nuclear reactor was one of a barely contained explosion, not the steady-state thermal plants developed later. As a consequence, the work is dangerous, and the slightest mistake could be catastrophic. All the technical staff are monitored by psychologists who have the authority to remove them from the work at any time lest they crack under the pressure and precipitate a disaster. The monitoring itself contributes to the problem.

The supervisor calls up Dr. Lentz, a fictional student of Alfred Korzybski, to analyze the situation. It turns out that the calculations on the stability of the reactor have greatly underestimated the scale of the reaction should the reactor go out of control. The situation seems hopeless, as the energy produced by the reactor is sorely needed on Earth, oil having been monopolized by the military. Using a method called "calculus of statement", Lentz helps the team to mitigate the pressure harming the plant operators.

Lentz's solution takes into account the social, psychological, physical, and economic variables. One of the by-products of the reactor is a more stable nuclear fuel which can also be used as the basis for a rocket engine. Armed with their theories and the new fuel, the protagonists undertake a campaign to have the reactor shut down, moved into space, and used as a source for the fuel, which will supply the needs of Earth and take humanity into space. Their final card is a shame campaign which will subject the trustees of the reactor to public vilification.  

In Heinlein's Future History, the next story sequentially is "The Man Who Sold the Moon", in which the reactor exploded in space. The actual cause was the detonation of the service rocket's fuel, caused by the effects of cosmic radiation on the supposedly stable nuclear material.

Reception
In 2016, the story was nominated for the 1941 Retro-Hugo Award for Best Novelette.

References

External links

Short stories by Robert A. Heinlein
1940 short stories
Works originally published in Analog Science Fiction and Fact